La llama is a 1915 Spanish language opera by the Basque composer José María Usandizaga.

References

Compositions by José María Usandizaga
1915 operas
Operas
Spanish-language operas